Sir John Moore Barracks is a military installation near Winchester.

History
The site used to be known as RAF Flowerdown until 1986 when it was renamed Sir John Moore Barracks, after Lieutenant General Sir John Moore, and became the new depot for the Light Division when they moved from Peninsula Barracks, Winchester.

The barracks went on to become the home of the Army Training Regiment, Winchester.

In November 2016 the Ministry of Defence announced that the site would close in 2021. This was later extended to 2024, and once more to 2026.

References

Barracks in England
Installations of the British Army
Military education and training in Hampshire